Cilla is a BBC TV programme hosted by British singer Cilla Black. It ran for eight series from 30 January 1968 to 17 April 1976. From series 3 onwards, the shows were produced and broadcast in colour.

History 
Then-British singing star Cilla Black was offered her own show on the BBC, to be eponymously called Cilla, by Bill Cotton in 1967. Cotton was then Assistant Head of Light Entertainment. The first series of the show started broadcasting on Tuesday, 30 January 1968, on the first show of which Black's guest was Tom Jones and the two music stars sang a duet together. Paul McCartney (without Lennon) wrote the theme tune entitled "Step Inside Love", which became another chart success for Black (this song was later covered by Madeline Bell). The series featured guest appearances by many stars of the era, including Henry Mancini, Johnny Mathis, Andy Williams, Charles Aznavour, Matt Monro, Sacha Distel, Donovan, Georgie Fame, Ethel Merman, the Shadows and Phil Everly.

This success paved the way for a lengthy television career for Black, which continued until 2003. Black began the 1970s by appearing on the BBC's highly rated review of the sixties music scene Pop Go The Sixties, performing "Anyone Who Had a Heart" on the show, broadcast across Europe and BBC1, on 31 December 1969. However, Black had not been able to appear in the studio with the other artists due to ill health, so her contribution was represented by a clip taken from her eponymous TV series shown in November 1969.

Like many of her contemporaries during the 1970s, Black's musical career later declined. She toured often but became increasingly thought of as a television personality. But her BBC series Cilla ran for almost a decade, racking up eight seasons between January 1968 and April 1976. The theme songs from the Cilla series were also successful. "Step Inside Love" opened the series for the runs for the first four series from 1968 to early 1971 and reached number 8 in the UK singles chart on its release. "Something Tells Me (Something's Gonna Happen Tonight)" was the theme for the late 1971 and 1973 shows, reaching number 3 and becoming Black's last top-ten success. "Baby, We Can't Go Wrong" was used for the 1974 series and was a minor success, reaching number 36, Black's last UK chart song until 1993. The final series in 1976 used the song "It's Now", which was included as a B-Side of "Little Things Mean A Lot", which failed to chart.

The UK's Eurovision Song Contest entry selection process was part of the Cilla show in both 1968 and 1973, when Black's close friend Cliff Richard was the featured artist performing all the songs shortlisted in the A Song For Europe segment. Black had been asked to sing for the 1968 contest, but declined because she thought it unlikely that another British female vocalist would win after Sandie Shaw, who had won the previous year. She was asked again in 1969 to represent the UK in 1970, but declined as she was pregnant at the time. The 1974 series was also scheduled to feature the 'Song for Europe' process, but Black was uncomfortable at promoting another female singer (Olivia Newton-John) each week throughout the series' run and in a rather last minute decision, the BBC agreed to move the process to another series: Clunk Click, As It Happens hosted by Jimmy Savile.

An episode broadcast in March 1968 was found by a fairground owner whose father was a film collector; it was shown at Missing Believed Wiped on 16 December 2017.

The series

Series 1 (1968)
Produced by Michael Hurll. Broadcast Tuesdays on BBC1 at 8:00pm. Theme Song: "Step Inside Love".

Series 2 (1968–69)
Produced by Michael Hurll. Broadcast Wednesdays on BBC1 at 8:00pm (unless otherwise noted). Theme Song: "Step Inside Love"

Series 3 (1969)
Produced by Michael Hurll. Broadcast Tuesdays on BBC1 at 8:00pm Theme Song: "Step Inside Love"

Series 4 (1971)
Produced by Michael Hurll. Broadcast Saturdays on BBC1. Theme Song: "Step Inside Love"

Series 5 (1971)
Produced by Michael Hurll. Broadcast Saturdays on BBC1. Theme Song: "Something Tells Me (Something's Gonna Happen Tonight)"

Series 6 (1972–73)
Produced by Michael Hurll. Broadcast Saturdays on BBC1. Theme Song: "Something Tells Me (Something's Gonna Happen Tonight)"

Series 7 (1974)
Produced by Colin Charman (shows 1-9) and Michael Hurll (shows 10-11). Broadcast Saturdays on BBC1 (except where noted). Theme Song: "Baby, We Can't Go Wrong"

Series 8 (1976)
Produced by Michael Hurll & James Moir. Broadcast Saturdays on BBC1. Theme Song: "It's Now!"

References

External links
 

Cilla Black
Lost BBC episodes
BBC Television shows
BBC television talk shows
1960s British television series
1970s British television talk shows
1968 British television series debuts
1976 British television series endings